Amrita Thapa (Nepali: अम्रिता थापा) is a Nepali communist politician, a former Maoist insurgent, coordinator of the Women Wing of the ruling Nepal Communist Party (NCP), and member of the Nepal House of Representatives of the federal parliament of Nepal, elected under the proportional representation system.

References

Living people
21st-century Nepalese women politicians
21st-century Nepalese politicians
Nepal MPs 2017–2022
Members of the 1st Nepalese Constituent Assembly
Communist Party of Nepal (Maoist Centre) politicians
1972 births